Mukařov is a municipality and village in Prague-East District in the Central Bohemian Region of the Czech Republic. It has about 2,800 inhabitants.

Administrative parts
Villages of Srbín and Žernovka are administrative parts of Mukařov.

References

Villages in Prague-East District